Re:Verse is a South Korean reality competition show created by Kakao Entertainment. The purpose of the competition show is to make a virtual 5 member girl group. The 30 participants already being members of a debuted girl group and have an opportunity to debut in a group in the virtual world. The show premiered on January 2, 2023 was broadcast through KakaoPage until their final episode on March 6, 2023, which announced the final five members of the group Fe:verse.

Concept
'RE:VERSE' is a survival idol show where 30 members of a real-life K-pop girl group compete for an debut opportunity in the virtual world 'W'. It applies virtual reality and motion capture technology to capture the participants gestures and expressions in real time and transmits them live through virtual characters to vividly direct their performances. The contestants can't reveal their identity in the real world until they are eliminated from the show.

Promotion and Broadcast
At the beginning of October 2022, various promotional clips and contents were uploaded onto the RE:VERSE official channels.

The theme song,  "약속해 (I Promise)"  was released on November 26, 2022 and the music video was shown during the MMA Awards.  

The show was originally scheduled to air on November 28, 2022, but due to circumstances regarding licensing for artwork within the virtual reality, the show was indefinitely postponed and all social media was deleted. On December 26, 2022, it was announced the survival show will officially air on January 2, 2023 after dealing with the circumstances. After the licensing circumstances, the credits of the creation of the artwork was shown at the end of each episode.  

The virtual reality is created and filmed through VRChat. The show is premiered on KakaoPage, YouTube, Abema and Kocowa.  

From February 6, 2023, Kakao Entertainment announced a webtoon named 'Girls Reverse Behind' featuring the contestants of Girls Reverse through KakaoPage and Kakao Webtoon every Monday.

Cast

Judges
Boom 
Bada  
Aiki 
Pengsoo

Guest
Apoki
Lee Min-hyuk

Contestants
There are total of 30 contestants participating in the competition, all from existing Korean girl groups.

The names of contestants are listed as named on official sites, not their real names.

Color key (In order of contestant's group rank on the show)

Ranking
Color key

Discography

Singles

Notes

References

External links 
  

2023 South Korean television series debuts
K-pop television series
Korean-language television shows
Music competitions in South Korea
South Korean reality television series